Cycling at the 2019 African Games was held from 21 to 29 August 2019 in Casablanca, Morocco. Mountain biking was held from 21 to 23 August 2019, while road bicycle racing was held from 24 to 29 August 2019.

Participating nations

Medal summary

Mountain bike

Road

Medal table

Notes

References

External links
Cycling Road – Results book
Cycling Mountain Bike – Results book

2019 African Games
African Games
2019 African Games
2019